Aodh Ollabhar Ó Carrthoidh aka Aodh Ollbhar Ó Cárthaigh, Gaelic-Irish poet, fl. mid-15th century.

Overview
Ó Cárthaigh was an Irish poet who was active sometime in the middle years of the 15th century. His family were natives of Uí Maine.

He is known from a single surviving poem, Tosach féile fairsinge, which survives in the following manuscripts:

 NLS Adv 72/1/37 Bk Dean Lism. first half of the 16th century
 RIA 743 (A/iv/3) 17th century
 RIA 785(23/G/8)T.ONeachtain et al.1711
 RIA3(23/L/17) S. OMurch.na R. 1744-5

It was published in 1938. It concerns the families of Ó Maol Ruanaidh rí Céise and Mac Diarmata of Moylurg. It mentions Tomhaltach Mac Diarmuda/mac na ríoghna ó Ráith Chruachan, and so may date from during or after Tomhaltach's lifetime. Rulers of Moylurg named Tomaltach were:

 Tomaltach na Cairge mac Diarmata, ruled 1196-1207
 Tomaltach Cear mac Diarmata, 1331–1336
 Tomaltach an Einigh mac Diarmata, 1421–1458

The Bardic Poetry Database  lists the subject of the poem as Tomaltach mc Conch.mhcAodha mhcCon MacDiarmada, who died in 1458.

Other poems by Ó Cárthaigh may survive, but if so, are unattributed.

See also
 Muireadhach Ua Cárthaigh (died 1067) was Chief Poet of Connacht

References
 Dioghluim Dána Láimhbheartach Mac Cionnaith Lambert McKenna (ed), Dublin, Oifig an tSoláthair [Government Publication Office], 1938, pp. 415–419
 The Surnames of Ireland, Edward MacLysaght, 1978

External links
 https://web.archive.org/web/20110727195006/http://bardic.celt.dias.ie/main.html
 http://www.ucc.ie/celt/online/G402143/header.html
 http://www.irishtimes.com/ancestor/surname/index.cfm?fuseaction=Go.&UserID=

Medieval Irish poets
People from County Galway
People from County Roscommon
Year of death unknown
15th-century Irish poets
Year of birth unknown
Irish male poets
Irish-language writers